Matia Bazar is an Italian pop band formed in Genoa in 1975. The original members of the group were Piero Cassano (keyboards), Aldo Stellita (bass), Carlo Marrale (guitar, vocals), Giancarlo Golzi (drums) and Antonella Ruggiero (vocals). They represented Italy in the 1979 Eurovision Song Contest with a song called "Raggio di luna". They are known for the quality of their female vocalists: after Antonella Ruggiero, Laura Valente, Silvia Mezzanotte, Roberta Faccani and currently Luna Dragonieri.

Their major hits were Solo tu (1978), Vacanze Romane (1982), Souvenir (1985)  and Ti Sento (1985), which peaked on the charts in Belgium, Netherlands and Italy.

Ruggiero and Marrale, the two main vocalists of the original line-up, left respectively in 1989 and 1994 to pursue solo careers. Main lyricist and bassist Stellita died in 1998 and drummer/writer and founding member Golzi in 2015. Cassano, the last original member, left in May 2017. The band is currently led by Fabio Perversi, keyboardist and multi-instrumentalist since 1998, who has been indicated by Cassano and Golzi as the right person to carry on the new era of the band, which in their idea "should survive to their original members".

Personnel 

Current members

 Fabio Perversi – vocals, keyboards, violin (1998–present)
 Silvia Dragonieri – vocals (2017–present)
 Silvio Melloni – bass (2021–present)
 Gino Zandonà – guitars (2021–present)
 Piercarlo Tanzi – drums (2021–present)

Former members

 Piero Cassano – vocals, guitars, keyboards (1975–1981, 1999–2017)
 Antonella Ruggiero – vocals (1975–1989)
 Carlo Marrale – guitars, vocals (1975–1994)
 Aldo Stellita – bass (1975–1998; died 1998)
 Giancarlo Golzi – drums (1975–2015; died 2015)
 Mauro Sabbione – keyboards (1981–1984; died 2022)
 Sergio Cossu – keyboards (1984–1998)
 Laura Valente – vocals (1990–1998)
 Silvia Mezzanotte – vocals (1999–2004, 2010–2016)
 Roberta Faccani – vocals (2005–2010)
 Piero Marras – guitars (2017–2021)
 Paola Zadra – bass (2017–2021)
 Fiamma Cardani – drums (2017–2021)

Discography 

 Matia Bazar 1 (1976)
 Granbazar (1977)
 Semplicità (1978)
 Tournée (1979)
 Il tempo del sole (1980)
 Berlino, Parigi, Londra (1982)
 Tango (1983)
 Aristocratica (1984)
 Melanchólia (1985)
 Melò (1987)
 Red Corner (1989)
 Anime pigre (1991)
 Dove le canzoni si avverano (1993)
 Radiomatia (1995)
 Benvenuti a Sausalito (1997)
 Brivido caldo (2000)
 Dolce canto (2001)
 Profili svelati (2005)
 One1 Two2 Three3 Four4 (2007)
 One1 Two2 Three3 Four4 - Volume due (2008)
 Conseguenza logica (2011)

Citations

External links 

 
 
 

Italian pop music groups
Eurovision Song Contest entrants for Italy
Eurovision Song Contest entrants of 1979
Sanremo Music Festival winners
Musical groups from Liguria
ZYX Music artists